Phú Hội is a rural commune of Nhơn Trạch District, Đồng Nai Province, Vietnam.

References

Populated places in Đồng Nai province
Communes of Đồng Nai province
District capitals in Vietnam